Innocent Bird, known in Japan as or , is a Japanese manga by Hirotaka Kisaragi, which has been licensed and is currently being published in English by Harper Collins Canada / Tk Blu Man Adu. All three volumes are currently available in English.

Plot
Karasu is an angel of the class Powers; Shirasagi is a demon, a Marquis. One day Karasu is assigned to convince Shirasagi to return to Hell. However, Shirasagi doesn't act like a demon at all—not only is he a priest, but he's forsworn the use of his demonic powers, and wishes nothing more than to live his life as a human. But the Archduke of Hell also has his eyes set on Shirasagi, and Karasu's own deviant behavior soon throws him out of God's favor. Will the pair be able to overcome the restrictions and laws of being an angel and a demon and live their lives freely?

Characters
  He is a jaded angel of the class Powers. His first assignment was to convince Shirasagi that he should return to Hell. But he realized the odd personality within Shirasagi, as Shirasagi tends to not behave or do anything that relates as a demon. Confounded by this discovery, Karasu becomes more attached to Shirasagi, and wants to protect and stay with him at all times.
  He is a demon of the priest class who seeks redemption. One day, when Karasu approached him and tried to convince him to go back to Hell, Shirasagi refused and explained that he wanted to be human. He forsworn the use of his demonic powers and wishes nothing more than to live his life as a human.

Volumes

|}

Reception

Holly Ellingwood of Active Anime describes the setting of the story as "Gothic", reminiscent of Angel Sanctuary, and the conclusion of the story as "incredible" and "captivating".

References

Further reading

External links
 

2002 manga
Supernatural anime and manga
Tokyopop titles
Yaoi anime and manga